Eating the Dinosaur is the sixth book written by Chuck Klosterman, first published by Scribner in 2009.  In the mold of Klosterman's earlier Sex, Drugs, and Cocoa Puffs, the book is a collection of previously unpublished essays concerning an array of pop culture topics.  The book cover was designed by Paul Sahre.

Essays
Eating the Dinosaur consists of 13 essays:

Something Instead of Nothing: an examination of the journalistic interview employing interviews with Errol Morris, documentary filmmaker, and Ira Glass, radio producer and host
Oh, the Guilt: a comparison of Kurt Cobain, Nirvana front man, and David Koresh, Branch Davidian leader
Tomorrow Rarely Knows: an analysis of time travel in fiction with a particular focus on Shane Carruth's 2004 film, Primer
What We Talk About When We Talk About Ralph Sampson: an exposition about the career and legacy of basketball star Ralph Sampson
Through a Glass, Blindly: a discussion of voyeurism in real life and in media, such as Alfred Hitchcock's 1954 film, Rear Window
The Passion of the Garth: a critique of Garth Brooks' alter ego project, Chris Gaines
Going Nowhere and Getting There Never: an exploration of the automobile's place in the American cultural psyche
"The Best Response": a series of "best responses" to controversial questions
Football: a piece about conservatism and progressivism in American football
ABBA 1, World 0: a retrospective of the unique style, particular appeal to American audiences, and lasting relevancy of Swedish pop music group, ABBA
"Ha ha," he said. "Ha ha.": a criticism of laugh tracks in sitcoms
It Will Shock You How Much It Never Happened: a discussion of PepsiCo's advertising strategies
All The Kids Are Right: an examination of pop music's aesthetic legitimacy
T is for True: an analysis of irony and literalism in media and the works and psyches of Weezer front man Rivers Cuomo, German filmmaker Werner Herzog, and American politician Ralph Nader
FAIL: an exegesis of the Unabomber manifesto

Reception
Eating the Dinosaur was positively received by critics. The Wall Street Journal discussed Klosterman's "pixelated intelligence and vivid prose," concluding, "Mr. Klosterman's relentlessly thoughtful prose makes a case that our arts and entertainment are more suffused with meaning than ever before. Even as he's fretting over the direction of the culture, his writing stands as an eloquent defense of it." At The A.V. Club, critic Samantha Nelson wrote that Klosterman's work had "matured".

References

External links
 The Wall Street Journal on Eating the Dinosaur.
 Eating the Dinosaur at Simon & Schuster
 "Eating the Dinosaur": Football at ESPN.com's Page 2

2009 non-fiction books
American non-fiction books
Popular culture books
Essay collections
Works by Chuck Klosterman